Prophet Joseph is an Iranian Islamic television series produced, written, and directed by Farajollah Salahshoor. It is based on the Islamic account of Joseph from Quran and Islamic traditions.

Cast

 Ahmad Harhash as Hazrat Yusaf

Episodes

Series description 
Prophet Joseph is a Persian-language mini-series originally broadcast in 2008, which tells the story of prophet Yusuf (or Joseph) according to the Islamic tradition. Realistic depictions of everyday life are represented. Each episode in the series begins with a poly-phonic recitation of the first four verses (ayah) of the chapter (surah) on Yusuf.

The 45 episodes of the series are replete with themes on filial love, personal journey through life (within family and on one's own), personal character, submission, prayer, prophethood, idolatry, monotheism, loyalty, betrayal, carnal desires, nature of various kinds of love, separation, abandonment, slavery, social organizations at various levels, nature of political authority, governance, strategy, various ideologies (and their implications), anticipation, and finally, forgiveness and salvation.

The series explores the existential lives of three principal characters (Yusuf, Zuleikha and Ya'qub) with dozens of other major and minor characters.

The story in the series starts in the south of Babylon, in the second millennium BC, depicting Ya'qub's battle against idolatry (of Ishtar) in Mesopotamia and the miraculous birth of Yusuf.

Production 
All episodes are created by Al-Baraka Production , Al-Baraka Media and published by HispanTV on YouTube.

The 16-DVD distribution from Soroush.tv contains a bonus, last DVD describing the making of the movie, including interviews with many of the production crew and a number of assistants to the director.

In this DVD and subsequent interviews, the director, Farajollah Salahshoor, gives his production account, as follows:
 The preparation of the script took between three and four years. 
 The first conceptual draft of about 27 pages ended up in a final scene plan and script draft running about 5000 pages long. 
 Besides the sources available in Persian, hundreds of pages were translated from Arabic and English. 
 The movie set was spread over three mock cities built in space of about 35,000 square meters. 
 In these sources, Salahshour emphasized that without such a concerted effort on completing the script, making the movie within the budget would have been impossible. The writing crew included the director, a head of research with multiple assistants and an artistic adviser. Upon completion, the script was also reviewed by a 5-person committee composed of experts in the arts as well as production crew to ensure quality.
 About 3000 actors were tested and 200 were selected. The selection involved team work. 
 Every team included consultants and leads. Consultants played a constructive role. 
 The movie was made with more than 1000 clothing elements and 10 trucks of accessories.

Salahshoor describes his reasons for making the movie in an interview with a Shia TV station, with a concurrent translation into English.

Distribution
The series, dubbed in English, can be viewed on Iran's iFilm movie network.

The original series, in Persian, can also be obtained in a 16-DVD, two-box set from its official distributor, Soroush Multimedia Company of Iran (Soroush.tv). First 15 DVDs contain 3 episodes each. Last DVD contains 3 episodes on the making of the series.

In 2023, once again Irani Media HispanTV took over its distribution and released it in Urdu on its official YouTube channel in Full HD 1080p. It is the biggest channel of Iran which is being managed by Al-Baraka Media & Al-Baraka Production.

Available Languages 
The movie was filmed in Persian. The Persian is of the classical "Dastoori" kind (as opposed to the shortened and inflected vernacular). Dastoori Persian has been used in Persian poetry and prose since around the 10th century.

It has been dubbed into Arabic in Al-Kawthar TV and there is also another version with English subtitles, which has been and is currently in 2017 being broadcast on IRIB. A Turkish dubbed version was aired on Kanal 7. An Azerbaijani dubbed version licensed by CineSalam Production aired on Space TV. In 2011, Televizija Sarajevo added subtitles in Bosnian. It is currently aired on TVSA, as well as NTVIC Kakanj (mostly during the holy month of Ramadan on a yearly basis).

An Urdu dubbed version of the television series titled "Prophet Yousuf" has been telecast in India on the Shia television network - Channel WIN, starting from 19 June 2015. A Bengali dubbed version has also been telecast in SA TV of Bangladesh from 27 November 2016.

A dubbed version in English can also be found on YouTube.

Reception
Given that the series is quite long and the original language is in Persian, authoritative reviews in English have been scant. The number of views of various dubbed versions indicate some popularity among viewers. The trailer to the version of the series dubbed in English has been seen more than 350 thousand times on YouTube as of the second quarter of 2017. The first of the series, dubbed in English, and available on YouTube shows 300 thousand views as of the second quarter of 2017. The last (45th) episode in the same version (dubbed in English) shows about 125 thousand views as of the second quarter of 2017.

Controversies
Some scholars in Egypt's Al Azhar theological school have been reported by a Saudi-owned television station to have advocated the banning of Yusuf in Egypt.

The director's daughter who grew up in a religious family criticized her father's work publicly, she believes that promotion of polygamy is planned by IRIB in Islamic Republic of Iran. (Iran TV.)  She said, "… we are not monitoring anyone and everyone has his personal interpretation." She added, "I, as a normal audience, without considering my relation with the director, am very worried about the youths of this country and how the religion is defined for them, worried about the future of this generation, religion, morality and the Quran. What should youths choose?"

Salhashoor commented, "Polygamy had existed in past religions and theological schools. If for some reasons it has been changed is due to the modern world. The prophets and the Prophet's predecessors had second and third wives. It had been in the past and in many Islamic countries, there is still this culture though some Shiites want to revise it. There was polygamy in the past, I could not ignore the fact to please the feminists, again I emphasize that we do not promote polygamy. It is not our intention we just express a historical document."

Aftermath
Katayoun Riahi an Iranian actress who played Potiphar's wife has resigned from acting after playing in this TV series. Since moral values, serenity, respect, modesty and hijab were brought up in this film she could no longer endure any scene. She added: "I do not want to play anymore and I want to keep the sweetness of what I experienced inside me forever."

See also
 The Men of Angelos
The Kingdom of Solomon
Saint Mary
The Messiah
Muhammad: The Messenger of God
List of Islamic films

References

External links

 A 16 DVD in two box sets from the original distributor in Persian, Soroush.tv (First 15 DVDs contain 3 episodes each. Last DVD contains 3 episode on the making of the series.) 
 All Episodes dubbed in English on YouTube
 All Episodes dubbed in Urdu on YouTube
 Trailer to the English Edition
 Yousuf-e Payambar
 Yousuf-e Payambar

2008 Iranian television series debuts
2009 Iranian television series endings
Iranian drama television series
Cultural depictions of Joseph (Genesis)
Television series about Islam
Cultural depictions of Akhenaten
Cultural depictions of Nefertiti
Television shows set in ancient Egypt
Films based on the Quran
Islamic Republic of Iran Broadcasting original programming